Road Dogs is a studio album by British Bluesman John Mayall with the Bluesbreakers. Recorded between 10 January and 10 February 2005 in Calabasas, California.

Track listing
All song words and music by John Mayall except where indicated.

 "Road Dogs" (6:03)
 "Short Wave Radio" (5:05)
 "So Glad" (4:05)
 "Forty Days" (4:06)
 "To Heal the Pain" (5:16)
 "Burned Bridges" (4:32)
 "Snake Eye" (4:01)
 "Kona Village" (4:54)
 "Beyond Control" (6:35)
 "Chaos in the Neighborhood" (5:10)
 "You'll Survive" (4:41)
 "Awestruck and Spellbound" (Buddy Whittington, Joe Yuele, 3:58)
 "With You" (4:37)
 "Brumwell's Beat" (Joe Yuele, Buddy Whittington,  3:56)
 "Scrambling" (3:40)

Personnel
The Bluesbreakers 
 John Mayall – vocals, keyboards, harmonica
 Buddy Whittington – guitars
 Hank Van Sickle – bass guitar
 Joe Yuele – drums
Additional musicians
 Tom Canning – keyboards on all tracks but 1, 4 & 5
 Dave Morris, Jr. – violin on 5
 Eric Steckel – lead guitar on track 10

Transcribed from an original album cover.

References

2005 albums
John Mayall albums
Albums produced by John Mayall
Eagle Records albums